Protestant Church in the Rhineland (EKiR) is a United Protestant church body in parts of the German states of North Rhine-Westphalia, Rhineland-Palatinate, Saarland and Hesse (Wetzlar). This is actually the area covered by the former Prussian Rhine Province until 1920.

The seat of the church is in Düsseldorf. The church leader is not called a "bishop", but a praeses, and there is no cathedral. The Protestant Church in the Rhineland is a full member of the Evangelical Church in Germany (EKD), and is a Prussian Union Church. The current praeses is Manfred Rekowski. The Evangelical Church in the Rhineland is one of 20 Lutheran, united, and Reformed churches of the EKD. As of December 2020, the church has 2,398,996 members in 809 parishes. The Protestant Church in the Rhineland is a member of the UEK and the Community of Protestant Churches in Europe and also the Reformed Alliance. In Bonn the church runs a conference venue called Evangelische Akademie Bonn-Bad Godesberg. It is a member of the Conference of Churches on the Rhine.

Some theological statements 
The theological teaching goes back on Martin Luther.
The ordination of women is allowed. The blessing of same-sex unions has been allowed by the synod and depends on the local church administration.

History 
The Protestant Church in the Rhineland emerged on 12 November 1948, when the Ecclesiastical Province of the Rhineland within the Evangelical Church of the old-Prussian Union gained independence as its own church body.
The Protestants in Hohenzollern emerged 1950 to Württemberg, keeping the  Old Prussian mass.

Legislative assembly and leaders 
The legislative assembly of the Evangelical Church in the Rhineland is the regional synod (Landessynode). The election of the synod is for four years. Since 1975 the synod meets annually in January in Bad Neuenahr-Ahrweiler (before 1975 in Bad Godesberg). Its elected leader (praeses) is also leader of the church.

Praesides 
The legislative body, then called the provincial synod (Provinzialsynode), was already established when the Rhenish church still formed an ecclesiastical province of the Evangelical Church of the old-Prussian Union. The then praesides were only speakers of the synod but not the leaders of the ecclesiastical province. Instead this function was with the general superintendents. Since the ecclesiastical province assumed its independence each praeses is speaker of the synod and leader of the church. 
 1835–1846: Franz Friedrich Gräber
 1847–1851: Georg August Ludwig Schmidtborn
 1853–1860: Johann Heinrich Wiesmann
 1862–1864: Johann Karl Friedrich Maaß
 1865–1877: Friedrich Nieden
 1877–1888: Stephan Friedrich Evertsbusch
 1890–1893: Karl Wilhelm Ferdinand Kirschstein
 1893–1898: Valentin Umbeck
 1899–1905: Friedrich Wilhelm Schürmann
 1908–1912: Albert Hackenberg
 1914–1917: Georg Hafner
 1919–1932: Friedrich Walter Paul Wolff
 1932–1934: Friedrich Schäfer
 1934–1935: Paul Humburg
 1935–1948: Friedrich Horn, praeses of the provincial synod
 1948–1957: Heinrich Karl Ewald Held, praeses of the regional synod and leader of the church
 1958–1971: Joachim Wilhelm Beckmann
 1971–1981: Karl Immer
 1981–1989: Gerhard Brandt
 1989–1996: Peter Beier
 1996–1997: vacancy
 Hans Ulrich Stephan, superior church counsellor and praeses per pro
 1997–2003: Manfred Kock
 2003–2013: Nikolaus Schneider
 2013–present: Manfred Rekowski

Books
 Evangelisches Gesang-Buch
 Evangelisches Gesangbuch für Rheinland und Westfalen, Dortmund, 1883
 Evangelisches Gesangbuch für Rheinland und Westfalen, Dortmund, 1929
 Evangelisches Kirchengesangbuch, Edition for Churches in Rhineland, Westphalia and Lippe, Bielefeld, 1969

References

External links 
 Evangelical Church in the Rhineland
 Evangelical Church in Germany

Rhineland
Rhineland
Rhineland
Rhineland
Rhineland
Rhineland
Church
1948 establishments in Germany